Huntleya lucida is a species of orchid that occurs in northern Brazil (Roraima), Ecuador, Guyana, Honduras and Venezuela.

References 

lucida
Orchids of Brazil
Flora of Roraima
Orchids of Ecuador
Orchids of Guyana
Orchids of Honduras
Orchids of Venezuela